"I Wish" is a song by Shanice. It was the fourth single released from her third album, 21... Ways to Grow. A music video was filmed, however, the original version of the song was not used for the video, the "No Stokes Remix" was the one that was used instead. The remixes can be viewed on YouTube

Track listing
12" single
A1. "I Wish" (Radio Edit) (3:49)
A1. "I Wish" (LP Version) (5:56)
A1. "I Wish" (TV Track) (5:56)
A1. "I Wish" (Pop Edit) (3:36)

Promo CD Single
1. "I Wish" (Main Remix) [4:15]
2. "I Wish" (LP Version) [5:57]
3. "I Wish" (No Stokes Remix) [4:15]
4. "I Wish" (Remix Instrumental) [4:17]
5. "I Wish" (Remix Acapella) [4:14]

Weekly charts

References

1994 singles
Shanice songs
1994 songs
Motown singles